GSIM may refer to:

Jama'at Nasr al-Islam wal Muslimin, an Al Qaeda affiliated group in Mali
GSIM Yenişehir Ice Hockey Hall or Palandöken Ice Skating Hall, an indoor ice skating and ice hockey rink located at Ahmet Baba neighborhood of Palandöken district in Erzurum, eastern Turkey owned by Youth and Sport Directorate of Erzurum Province (GSIM)
Erzurum GSIM Ice Arena, an indoor ice hockey arena located at Yakutiye district of Erzurum, eastern Turkey
Graduate School of International Management (GSIM) Business school, part of the International University of Japan